Kickle Cubicle is a puzzle game developed by Irem for the arcades in 1988 and then ported to Nintendo Entertainment System in 1990.

Story
The protagonist Kickle wakes up one day to find his homeland, the Fantasy Kingdom, turned to ice by the Wicked Wizard King. The King has imprisoned the people in Dream Bags. Only Kickle was unaffected. Kickle sets out to save the kingdom with his special freezing breath, which he uses to turn the invaders into ice to use against his foes.

Gameplay
The player must travel through the four lands in the Fantasy Kingdom, which Kickle plays in a set order. Each land has a boss at the end. After completing all four lands, the "special game" begins, consisting of 30 harder levels.

The player controls Kickle to solve a series of puzzles that take place on frozen islands. The goal of each level is to collect the red Dream Bags. There are several types of deadly enemies. Kickle can use his freezing breath ability to turn some enemies into ice to create walkways on water or to defeat other enemies. He can also create a pillar of ice in front of him to act as a block.

Regional differences
 The Japanese version tends to have more enemies present in the various levels.
 In the Japanese version, the player can attempt the different levels of each world in any order. In the North American and European releases, the world order is fixed.

Reception 
In Japan, Game Machine listed Kickle Cubicle on their August 1, 1988 issue as being the thirteenth most-successful table arcade unit of the month.

Notes

References

External links

Kickle Cubicle review at Retro Game Age

1990 video games
Arcade video games
Nintendo Entertainment System games
Irem games
Puzzle video games
Video games developed in Japan
Single-player video games